Sultan Ahmad Shah II ibni Almarhum Sultan Abdul Kadir Alauddin Shah (died 1617) is the 11th Sultan of Pahang who reigned from 1590 to 1592. Known as Raja Ahmad before his accession, he is the only son of the tenth Sultan of Pahang, Abdul Kadir Alauddin Shah, by a royal wife. He succeeded on the death of his father in 1590 and reigned under the regency of his elder half-brother, Raja Abdul Ghafur.

In the interregnum period following the death of Abdul Ghafur Muhiuddin Shah in 1614, Pahang descent into chaos and was conquered by Aceh Sultanate under Sultan Iskandar Muda in 1617. The former Sultan Ahmad Shah II and his family was taken as a hostage to Aceh, where he died after 1617. Ahmad Shah's eldest son, Raja Mughal later known as Iskandar Thani was married to Iskandar Muda's daughter, the later Queen Taj ul-Alam and eventually succeeded him as the 13th Sultan of Aceh in 1636.

References

1617 deaths
16th-century Sultans of Pahang
Monarchs who abdicated